Sebastián Ignacio Guenzatti Varela (born July 8, 1991) is a Uruguayan footballer who plays for Indy Eleven in the USL Championship.

Youth Career
Guenzatti was born in Uruguay before moving to the United States at 12, where he grew up in the College Point section of Queens in New York City, and graduated from Francis Lewis High School in Fresh Meadows, where he started for the soccer team all four years. Professional aspirations took Guenzatti back to his homeland, where he played with Peñarol's under-19 team, before moving to Huracán in 2013.

Senior Career
Guenzatti moved back to the United States on July 5, 2013 when he signed for NASL club New York Cosmos. Guenzatti made his debut for the Cosmos on August 10, 2013 in a 0-0 draw against Tampa Bay. He scored the game-winning goal in the team's 1-0 win over Minnesota United FC on September 14, 2013 and earned NASL Team of the Week honors for his performance. The Uruguayan scored one goal and recorded one assist in ten matches for the Cosmos during the 2013 season and played 86 minutes during the team's 2013 NASL Soccer Bowl championship game 1-0 victory over the Atlanta Silverbacks.

On January 3, 2014, the Cosmos announced that they had signed Guenzatti to a contract extension.

During the 2014 Spring season, Guenzatti was tied for second on the team in scoring, recording two goals and two assists in seven matches as the team posted a 6-2-1 (W-L-D) record and finished in second place in the NASL Spring Standings. He earned NASL Team of the Week honors for his Week 7 goal in the team's 1-1 draw with Indy Eleven.

He finished the regular season tied for second on the team in scoring with four goals and three assists in 22 appearances (19 starts). He scored the game-winning goal in the team's 1-0 victory over Ottawa Fury FC on July 20, 2014 which earned him NASL Team of the Week honors and he combined with fellow Queens native David Diosa to score in the team's 3-2 win over the Atlanta Silverbacks on September 13, 2014.

In 2015, Guenzatti scored four times in 23 appearances, which included 10 starts. Guenzatti opened the scoring in back-to-back 3-0 wins over the Atlanta Silverbacks (Oct. 7) and FC Edmonton (Oct. 11) He racked up 986 minutes on the field in NASL play.

On July 31, 2017, Guenzetti signed with United Soccer League side Tampa Bay Rowdies. Guenzatti was named team captain ahead of the 2019 season. On January 18, 2022, Guenzatti re-signed with the Rowdies.

On October 8, 2022, Guenzetti scored twice in a game against Loudoun United FC, passing his former teammate Georgi Hristov  to become the Rowdies all-time scoring leader.

On December 13, 2022, Tampa and Guenzetti mutually agreed to terminate his deal to allow him to pursue other opportunities. He subsequently signed with Indy Eleven on the same day.

Career Statistics

Honors 
New York Cosmos

 NASL Spring Championship (1): 2015
 NASL Fall Championship (2): 2013, 2016
 NASL Championship (3): 2013, 2015, 2016

Tampa Bay Rowdies

 Coastal Cup (1): 2020
 USL Championship Eastern Conference (1): 2020
 USL Championship Regular Season Title (1): 2021

References

External links
 Cosmos bio

1991 births
Living people
American soccer players
New York Cosmos (2010) players
Tampa Bay Rowdies players
Association football midfielders
North American Soccer League players
Footballers from Montevideo
American people of Uruguayan descent
Sportspeople of Uruguayan descent
Uruguayan footballers
Francis Lewis High School alumni
USL Championship players
Indy Eleven players